Doncaster Sheffield Airport , formerly named and commonly referred to as Robin Hood Airport, is an unscheduled international airport closed to passenger traffic (last passenger plane on 4 November 2022). The airport is located in Finningley near Doncaster in South Yorkshire, England.

It opened to passengers in 2005, operated by Peel Airports, a division of the Peel Group. The closed airport has a CAA Public Use Aerodrome Licence that allows flights for the public transport of passengers or for flying instruction. It had 1.22 million passengers in 2018.

The closure of Doncaster Sheffield Airport was announced in September 2022 after extensive reviews citing a lack of profitability. The last scheduled departure was on 29 October, with inbound flights continuing until 4 November 2022. On 2 November, the airport owner announced an acceptable offer of purchase had not been received, and the last passenger flight landed on 4 November.

History

1915–1995: RAF Finningley

The airport was opened as Finningley Airfield in 1915.

During World War I, it was a base for the Royal Flying Corps to intercept German Zeppelins targeting industrial cities of Northern England. In World War II the airfield was primarily used for training, serving RAF Bomber Command crews; only a few combat missions took off from Finningley. It was a key facility for nuclear-armed Vulcan bombers in the Cold War before downgrade to training in the 1970s / 1980s and decommissioning by 1995.

1999 purchase by Peel.

2005–2016: Robin Hood Airport

Following the end of scheduled services from Sheffield City Airport, former RAF Finningley was reopened as Robin Hood Airport Doncaster Sheffield (DSA) in April 2005. Low-cost flights and rising passenger demand made a new commercial airport feasible. The name of the airport was controversial and 11,000 people signed a petition to oppose it.

The airport's first commercial flight flew to Palma de Mallorca, departing at 09:15 on 28 April 2005. The airport was projected to serve at least a million passengers during 2006. The actual figure for its first year was 899,000, making the airport the 23rd largest in the UK. By August 2007, 2.28 million passengers had transited.

Long haul flights to North America began in summer 2007, with short-lived Flyglobespan routes to Hamilton, Ontario (for Toronto), and Thomsonfly to Orlando, Cancún and Puerto Plata. In 2007, over one million passengers used the airport, however, this had decreased to around 700,000 by 2012, before increasing again to 1.255 million in 2016.

In April 2010, EasyJet began flights from Doncaster to Amsterdam, Barcelona, Faro, Palma de Mallorca and Prague. They were expected to carry 300,000 passengers in the first year but ceased from 4 January 2011.

Peel Group sought outside investment and in 2010 Vantage Airport Group, the former Vancouver Airport Services, agreed to buy a 65% stake in Peel's airports, but following a  decline in passenger numbers Peel bought back the stakes in Durham Tees Valley and Robin Hood Airports in 2012. As a result, by January 2013 only Liverpool John Lennon Airport was 65% owned by Vantage Airport Group. Robin Hood Airport was once again wholly owned by Peel, and it majority owned Durham Tees Valley Airport, local councils retaining a minority stake. In 2014, Peel also recovered full ownership of Liverpool John Lennon Airport.

In September 2016, Doncaster Sheffield Airport became Sheffield United Football Club's official air travel provider. Promotion included advertising at Bramall Lane Stadium and provision of some free flights to the club's fans.

2016–2022: Doncaster Sheffield Airport

December 2016 rebranding included a change of name to Doncaster Sheffield Airport, with the Robin Hood label downgraded, and in September 2017 Sheffield Arena was renamed to Fly DSA Arena.

In October 2019, Flybe closed its facility at the airport, relocating crew and aircraft, though Wizz Air based two aircraft there in 2020.

Closure
In June 2022, Wizz Air announced it would terminate the majority of its flights from Doncaster/Sheffield, stating that the airport operators were "unable to guarantee the terms of its commercial agreement". This would leave TUI Airways as the airport's sole regular customer. 

In July 2022 the airport's board said aviation activity at the site "may no longer be commercially viable" and that there would be a six-week consultation into the airport's future. Peel L&P stated the airport had "never achieved the critical mass required to become profitable". The closure proposal drew strong local reaction, with an on-line petition established by local interest group Yorkshire Plane Spotters citing concerns over the loss of local employment opportunities, to the overall detriment of the region.

In late August 2022, the consultation period was extended until 16 September, with the result of the consultation announced on 26 September. On 26 September, it was announced the airport would start winding down activity from 31 October 2022, after 17 years of operation. The airport's sole based operator TUI operated its final flights on 4 November 2022. 

Wizz Air meanwhile announced it would transfer its Doncaster/Sheffield routes to Leeds Bradford Airport. They also operated the airport's final scheduled departure on 29 October 2022. Arrivals of inbound flights continued until 4 November 2022.

Post-closure

The local authority covering the airport, Doncaster Council, made an application for a judicial review in an attempt to question the legality of the closure process. However, the application was refused. Subsequently, the Mayor of Doncaster stated that the council was beginning the process of attempting to compulsorily purchase the airport and bring it into public ownership.

There has been increasing public support for the re-opening of the airport with a ongoing online petition gathering over 100k signatures, a GMB trade union petition with 100k+ signatures that was handed in to the Department for Transport in October 2022, a growing facebook group campaign to push for the re-opening of the airport and support from several MP's from the towns and counties surrounding the airport.

As part of the process of winding down operations at the airport, air traffic control service was withdrawn on 3 December 2022. In addition, the UK Civil Aviation Authority began the formal process of downgrading the airspace surrounding the airport from controlled to uncontrolled, due to the expected decrease in large aircraft movements in the area following the closure of the airport.

As of February 2023, talks about the airport are taking place between Peel and a prospective purchaser introduced by the local authority. South Yorkshire Mayoral Combined Authority previously offered to subsidise Peel's losses operating the airport for two years whilst negotiations with a buyer took place but that was rejected, as was an acquisition proposal from Doncaster City Council.

Facilities

Runway and terminal building

This stems from the airport's history as a former long-range nuclear bomber base (RAF Finningley). The runway was long enough that the airport was designated a Space Shuttle emergency landing site.

The passenger terminal had 24 check-in desks, six departure gates and three baggage carousels.

Airport hotel and car parks
A Ramada Encore chain hotel opened on 10 November 2008, with a 102-bed capacity. It is situated less than ten minutes walk from the Terminal building.

There are four on-site car parks at the airport: Short Stay, Long Stay, Premium Parking and Meet & Greet. All car parks are operated and managed by the airport and are all within walking distance of the terminal building.

Airport business park
Work is also progressing on a new business park across from the terminal, which will link to the access road into the airport. In March 2014 the  site for the park became part of Sheffield City Region Enterprise Zone.

Hangar buildings
No. 3 Hangar was occupied by 2Excel Aviation providing Design, production and Maintenance services.
Defence company BAE Systems formerly operated its Aircraft Maintenance Academy from No. 3 Hangar at the airport, before moving to Humberside Airport. Other companies that operated within the hangars included Bespoke Training Systems Limited, a Cessna Citation service centre, and Anglo European Express (Doncaster) Ltd (onsite regulated agents for air freight and cargo operations).

Flight training
The airport was home to Yorkshire Aero Club  who provided training for fixed wing aircraft and Hummingbird Helicopters who provided training for rotary wing aircraft. Yorkshire Aero Club and Hummingbird Helicopters provided introductory flying lessons and training towards the Private Pilot's Licence for aeroplanes and helicopters respectively.

Commercial service 

As of 5 November 2022, there are no more regular commercial passenger airline services to/from Doncaster Sheffield Airport. The last scheduled flight departed Doncaster Sheffield on 29 October 2022, while inbound aircraft continued until 4 November 2022. The airport mainly featured year-round and seasonal flights to leisure destinations around the Mediterranean as well as to cities in Central and Southeastern Europe with TUI Airways and Wizz Air being the primary tenants.

Statistics

Traffic statistics

Busiest routes

Vulcan XH558
In 2011, the Vulcan to the Sky Trust relocated Avro Vulcan XH558 to the airport, arriving from its former temporary winter base, RAF Lyneham, on 29 March. It was the last airworthy example of the Vulcan bomber fleet, restored to flight by the Trust in 2007. One of the reasons for the move to a commercial airport was to improve access for the public to see XH558 up close, something not possible while based at operational RAF bases. The move was deliberately not announced in advance, both to keep costs down at the not yet complete new base, and to not overshadow ongoing repatriation flights of Britain's war casualties to Lyneham from Afghanistan. The airport remained XH558's home base until its final flight, a display over the airport, on 28 October 2015.

With XH558 now permanently grounded, the Trust intended to remain at Doncaster Sheffield Airport, and make the Vulcan the focus of a new educational and heritage facility, the first stage being to establish the Vulcan Aviation Academy & Heritage Centre. Before 2022, the plan was to feature an academy building for 14-18 year olds, with the Vulcan housed in an adjacent heritage centre, where it would be maintained so as to be able to perform regular fast taxi runs, the frequency of which would be funding dependent.

However, on 15 August 2022, the Vulcan to the Sky Trust announced that it would be forced to leave the airport. Its fundraising efforts had proven unsuccessful, and even prior to the announcement concerning the airport's own future, the Trust had been informed its lease at the site would not be renewed beyond June 2023. At the time of the announcement, the decision regarding XH558's new home, and the means of its journey there, hadn't been finalised, but the trust was exploring the potential option of the aircraft flying for one last time when it finally leaves the airport. This was deemed too expensive and XH558 will likely be dismantled and moved to a new home by road.

Ground transport

Road
The airport is located close to the M18 motorway; a road link from Junction 3 of the M18 to Parrot's Corner (junction of the A638 and the B6463) was opened on 29 February 2016 before being extended to the airport on 15 June 2018. Part of the Finningley and Rossington Regeneration Route Scheme, the road is called the Great Yorkshire Way, and is a continuation of the A6182 road from Doncaster town centre. In addition the M18 has been widened to three lanes northbound from junction 2 (for the A1(M)) to Junction 3. Also nearby are the A1(M) and the M180.

Taxis are available directly outside the terminal building. These are operated by the airports official partner  Little Arrow Taxis.

Bus 
There are regular First South Yorkshire bus services directly linking the airport with Frenchgate Interchange.

The 57a and 57c bus services link the airport with Doncaster town centre calling at a number of local areas along the journey before arriving at Doncaster Frenchgate Interchange.

Rail

In addition, the airport lies alongside the Doncaster to Lincoln railway line, and plans for a station at Finningley to replace the station that closed in 1961 were granted planning permission in 2008. However, a 2012 report by Network Rail stated that more trains on the line would be required to make the station viable. There have also been plans to connect the airport to the East Coast Main Line with a dedicated rail link.

Accidents and incidents

 On 15 August 2014, a Links Air flight from Belfast City Airport, operated by G-GAVA, crashed on landing at the airport following a landing gear failure which caused substantial damage to the aircraft. One passenger was taken to hospital with minor injuries. The airport was closed for several hours.

In media
During its first few years of operation, the airport has featured in the media; in particular, numerous articles on its status as the UK's newest international airport have seen it become part of the debate on air tourism and environmental issues. On 24 January 2007, the airport featured in the BBC Two documentary Should I Really Give Up Flying?, with Doncaster actor Brian Blessed fronting local opinions on the issue.

 The airport has also been a filming location for popular television series such as ITV's Emmerdale, BBC One drama Hustle, and In the Club.
 The airport was a filming location for Film4 Productions film Four Lions.
 The airport was one of the settings for the BBC mockumentary Come Fly with Me. Matt Lucas and David Walliams spent two weeks at the airport filming. The programme aired from Christmas 2010 through January 2011.
 The airport (or at that time RAF Finningley) had several appearances in the 1984 BBC nuclear war docudrama Threads, where it was destroyed by a Soviet nuclear warhead.

Name

Until December 2016, the airport was branded Robin Hood Airport Doncaster Sheffield. The "Robin Hood" name was chosen for these reasons:
The airport has a historical connection to Nottinghamshire (as the parish of Finningley was, until 1974 and the Local Government Act 1972, administered as part of Nottinghamshire) and still resides in the boundary of the Diocese of Nottingham.
Some later Robin Hood legends, and the popular 20th-century books, films and TV programmes, are set in Sherwood Forest.
The forests of Sherwood and Barnsdale merged in this area of Yorkshire.
The name would provide an identity which would raise a lot of attention (if a little controversy) for the airport and create a marketing opportunity.

References

Bibliography

External links

Airports in England
Aviation in Doncaster
Transport in Doncaster
Buildings and structures in the Metropolitan Borough of Doncaster
Peel Airports
Airports in Yorkshire
Defunct airports in England
Airports established in 2005
Airports disestablished in 2022
2005 establishments in England
2022 disestablishments in England